Lycodon fasciatus, commonly known as the banded wolf snake, is a species of colubrid snake.

Distribution
It is found in India (Assam), Bangladesh, Myanmar, Thailand, Laos, Vietnam, Tibet, SW China (from Yunnan and Guangxi to Hubei, northward to Shaanxi and Gansu, Fujian, Sichuan).

Description
Adults may attain 53 cm (21 inches) in total length, with a tail 11 cm (4¼ inches) long.

Its color pattern consists of broad purplish-black rings which encircle its body and are separated by yellowish or reddish intervals. The first black ring does not encircle the neck.

The dorsal scales are in 17 rows, weakly keeled anteriorly, the keels becoming more pronounced posteriorly. The ventrals are 205–213; the anal is entire; and the divided subcaudals are 77–90.

Photos

References

Further reading
 Anderson, John. 1879. Anatomical and Zoological Researches: Comprising an Account of the Zoological Results of the Two Expeditions to Western Yunnan in 1866 and 1875; and a Monograph of the Two Cetacean Genera Platanista and Orcella. Bernard Quaritch, London "1878". Two volumes (Text: 985 pages [herpetology: pages 703–860, 969-975]; Atlas: 85 plates [herpetological plates 55–78, 75A, 75B]).
 Boulenger, George A. 1890. The Fauna of British India, Including Ceylon and Burma. Reptilia and Batrachia. Taylor & Francis, London, xviii, 541 pp.
 Daltry, J.C. & Wüster, W. 2002. A new species of Wolf Snake (Serpentes: Colubridae: Lycodon) from the Cardamom Mountains, Southwestern Cambodia. Herpetologica 58 (4): 498–504.

fasciatus
Fauna of Southeast Asia
Fauna of Tibet
Reptiles of Myanmar
Reptiles of China
Reptiles of India
Reptiles of Laos
Reptiles of Thailand
Reptiles of Vietnam
Reptiles described in 1879
Taxa named by John Anderson (zoologist)

Snakes of China
Snakes of Vietnam
Snakes of Asia